Jean-Luc Lambourde (born 10 April 1980) is a French football player who plays for Amical Club on the island of Guadeloupe in the Guadeloupe Division d'Honneur. He plays as a defender and began his football career playing for amateur club Avion in 2002. After spending three seasons with the club, Lambourde ventured to his native homeland joining his current club, where he currently remains. In his second season with the club, he won the Coupe de Guadeloupe. Lambourde is also a member of the Guadeloupe national football team. He is one of a few players in the team to have participated in all three of the team's appearances as the CONCACAF Gold Cup.

Honours 
Coupe de Guadeloupe: 1
 2006

References

External links 
 

1980 births
Living people
French footballers
Guadeloupean footballers
Guadeloupe international footballers
French people of Guadeloupean descent
CS Avion players
2011 CONCACAF Gold Cup players
2009 CONCACAF Gold Cup players
2007 CONCACAF Gold Cup players
French beach soccer players
Association football defenders